Ricky Vela is an American songwriter who has written songs since 1986. Vela's credits includes written material for Selena y Los Dinos, Leones Del Norte, Mazz, Pete Astudillo, Thalía, Cristian Castro, David Lee Garza, and A. B. Quintanilla's band Kumbia Kings. Vela came to prominence as a songwriter after he was hired as the keyboardist for Selena y Los Dinos in 1986. His first songwriting credit was on "Dame un Beso", a collaborative effort with A. B. Quintanilla, for Selena's Alpha (1986) album. "Dame un Beso" was nominated at the 1987 Tejano Music Awards for Single of the Year and Song of the Year, and became Selena's first critically acclaimed single. "Dame tu Amor" was the first recording Vela co-wrote with the manager of Selena y Los Dinos, Abraham Quintanilla. The tracks "Dame un Beso" and "Dame tu Amor" received a resurgence in popularity in the 21st century. "Dame tu Amor" peaked at number 31 on the Hot Ringtones chart in 2006 following the release of Classic Series Vol. I. Following the release of Selena: The Series (2020—21), "Dame un Beso" peaked at number 25 on the US Billboard Latin Digital Song Sales chart. Vela wrote "Quiero Estar Contigo" for Tejano music band Leones del Norte in 1992.

In 1993, Vela wrote "Tu Robaste Mi Corazon", a duet with Selena featuring Emilio Navaira for the singer's Selena Live! album. Vela also wrote "No Debes Jugar" for Selena Live!; the song peaked at number three on the Hot Latin Songs chart and was certified platinum by the Recording Industry Association of America (RIAA) which denotes 60,000 units consisting of sales and on-demand streaming. For Selena's Amor Prohibido (1994), Vela wrote or cowrote "El Chico del Apartamento 512", "Tus Desprecios", "Ya No", "Fotos y Recuerdos", and "No Me Queda Más". "No Me Queda Más" peaked at number one on the Hot Latin Songs chart, it became the most successful US Latin single of 1995. Singer-songwriter Chrissie Hynde initially prevented the band from releasing "Fotos y Recuerdos" after she found out it sampled her "Back on the Chain Gang" (1983) single. She eventually allowed the band to include it on Amor Prohibido after Vela provided an English-language translation of the track for Hynde. "Fotos y Recuerdos" peaked at number one on the Hot Latin Songs chart following the shooting death of Selena on March 31, 1995. Vela remained an active presence in the music industry and provided songs he wrote to various artists, with his final songwriting credit "Contigo" which was written for Kumbia Kings in 2003. The track "Lo Dejo Solo" which was penned by Vela in 1986 was shelved and remained unreleased until 2006 on the posthumously released Classic Series, Vol. I.

Songs

Notes

References

Works cited 

Songs written by Ricky Vela
Vela, Ricky, List of songs written by